St. Peter Claver Cristo Rey Catholic High School was a private, Roman Catholic high school in Omaha, Nebraska, United States.  It was located in the Roman Catholic Archdiocese of Omaha.

Background
St. Peter Claver Cristo Rey Catholic HS is an Omaha high school that opened in August, 2007. The St.  Class of 2011 was its first and last graduating class.  It was part of the Cristo Rey Network of high schools, the original being Cristo Rey Jesuit High School in Chicago's Pilsen neighborhood.

St. Peter Claver is known for having a very diverse variety of students. Located in the heart of south Omaha, St. Peter Claver (known to the students as SPC) rose to fame in 2008 because of its unique Hire4ED program.

Approximately only 200 students went to St. Peter Claver.

In 2006, priests in London, UK were thinking of a new way to teach and educate. They brainstormed the idea of a Catholic working high school. In 2007, priests flew to Omaha and started St. Peter Claver Cristo Rey Catholic HS. With the help of Father James Keiter, in August 2007 the school was opened.

The president of SPC was Father James Keiter. Its first principal was Leigh Florita, and after her departure, the second principal became Susan Wilde.

Rumors erupted in 2010 that St. Peter Claver would be shut down, all of which were denied by Fr. Keiter. The school remained open until February 11, 2011, when it was announced that it would indeed be closed.

Book about the Cristo Rey model 
In January 2008, Loyola Press released a book titled More than A Dream: How One School's Vision is Changing the World.  The book, by G.R. Kearney, a former volunteer teacher at Cristo Rey Jesuit High School in Chicago, documents the unlikely development of the Cristo Rey model and its remarkable success throughout the United States.

References

External links
  School website

Catholic secondary schools in Nebraska
Educational institutions established in 2007
Cristo Rey Network
Roman Catholic Archdiocese of Omaha
High schools in Omaha, Nebraska
2007 establishments in Nebraska